Patrícia Kimberly (born 6 January 1984) is a Brazilian sex worker.

Career 
In 2005, she began working on adult films. She is frequently invited to talk shows and interviews to speak in favor of prostitution and the adult film industry.

In 2018, Kimberly was a winner of the Carnival of São Paulo as a muse of the Acadêmicos do Tatuapé Samba school.

Marie Claire noted her as a "sex influencer" due to her large number of followers on social networks.

Awards

References

External links 
 
 
 
 
 

1984 births
Living people
Brazilian female prostitutes
Brazilian pornographic film actresses